Kate Crawford (born 1976) is a writer, composer, producer and academic. Crawford is a principal researcher at Microsoft Research (Social Media Collective), the co-founder and former director of research at the AI Now Institute at NYU, a visiting professor at the MIT Center for Civic Media, a senior fellow at the Information Law Institute at NYU, and an associate professor in the Journalism and Media Research Centre at the University of New South Wales. She is also a member of the WEF's Global Agenda Council on Data-Driven Development. Her research focuses on social change and media technologies, particularly on the intersection of humans, mobile devices, and social networks. She has published on cultures of technology use and the way media histories inform the present.

Background 
Crawford was previously part of the Canberra electronic music duo B(if)tek (along with Nicole Skeltys) and released three albums between 1998 and 2003. Crawford co-founded the Sydney-based Deluxe Mood Recordings record label and is a member of the Clan Analogue music collective.

As a writer Crawford has written for The Sydney Morning Herald and Foreign Policy. She was a Fellow of the Centre for Policy Development and in March 2008 she was selected as one of 1000 Australians to attend the Australia 2020 Summit in Canberra on 19–20 April 2008.

She is a member of the feminist collective Deep Lab.

Academic work 
Crawford has a PhD from the University of Sydney. In 2006 her book based on this dissertation, Adult Themes – Rewriting the Rules of Adulthood, won the individual category of the Manning Clark National Cultural Award and in 2008 she received the biennial medal for outstanding scholarship from the Australian Academy of the Humanities.

Crawford has spoken and published academic papers on such topics as social media, government regulation of media content, the interplay between gender and mobile devices, young people and sexting, and big data. She has given keynote addresses at venues such as the 2013 O'Reilly Strata Conference and the 2013 DataEDGE conference hosted by the University of California, Berkeley School of Information. She co-authored a book called "Understanding the Internet: Language, Technology, Media, and Power" in 2014.

In 2017 Crawford established the research institute AI Now Institute with Meredith Whittaker. It is associated with New York University Tandon School of Engineering.

In 2019 she was the inaugural holder of the AI & Justice visiting chair at École Normale Supérieure in Paris, in partnership with Fondation Abeona. She published a book Atlas of AI: Power, Politics, and the Planetary Costs of Artificial Intelligence through Yale University Press in 2021. Her article, "Artificial Intelligence Is Misreading Human Emotion", was shortlisted for The Bragg UNSW Press Prize for Science Writing in 2022.

References

External links
 
 B(if)tek Official Site

Living people
Australian women composers
Australian non-fiction writers
Writers from Sydney
Scientific American people
Academic staff of the University of New South Wales
1976 births
Philosophers of technology